Dolichopus griseipennis is a species of fly in the family Dolichopodidae. It is found in the Palearctic.

References

External links
representing Dolichopus at BOLD

griseipennis
Insects described in 1831
Asilomorph flies of Europe